Alava is a commune in Ștefan Vodă District, Moldova. It is composed of two villages, Alava and Lazo.

References

Communes of Ștefan Vodă District